Drnovk is a settlement north of Dobrovo in the Municipality of Brda in the Littoral region of Slovenia on the border with Italy.

References

External links
Drnovk on Geopedia

Populated places in the Municipality of Brda